Only one city applied with bids to host the 2022 Asian Games (also known as XIX Asian Games) in August 2015. The city of Hangzhou competed for the hosting rights to the event. The winning bid was announced on September 16, 2015, at the 34th OCA General Assembly in Ashgabat, Turkmenistan by OCA President Sheikh Ahmed Al-Fahad Al-Ahmed Al-Sabah.

Host city selection

Candidate city

Potential bids
  – Hong Kong made a failed bid for the 2006 Asian Games. The Government of the Hong Kong Special Administrative Region decided to submit a formal bid to OCA on December 14, 2010 for the 2023 Games. Previously, the region successfully hosted the 2009 East Asian Games. The original budget announced by the Government in September to host the games was a total of 44 billion HK dollars, among which 13.7–14.5 billion HK dollars would be direct cost. The Government decided to cut over half of the direct budget in early November in order to gather more public support. After several promotional campaigns, citizen support remains around 30%, with majority of citizens (57%) against holding the event in 2023, according to a survey result. The Government's appropriation bill for hosting the 2023 Games was rejected by the Legislative Council of Hong Kong in January 2011.
  – Thailand would like to host the fifth Asian Games in 2022.  But Thailand missed to submit the bid information because of delayed obtainment bid information and approvement from the cabinet yet. Although National Olympic Committee of Thailand make a proposal about postponement for submit bid information from August 5, 2015 to September 9, 2015, OCA denied for Thai proposal.

References

2022 Asian Games
Asian Games bids